Junior Torunarigha (born 18 April 1990) is a Nigerian professional footballer who plays as a forward.

Career
Born in Ibadan, Torunarigha has played for SV Fortuna Furth Glösa, Chemnitzer FC, Hertha BSC, Rot-Weiß Oberhausen, TSG Neustrelitz, Carl Zeiss Jena, ZFC Meuselwitz, FC Amberg and Fortuna Sittard.

Personal life
He also holds German citizenship.

His father, Ojokojo, is a former footballer who played for a number of clubs in Germany, while his younger brother Jordan is also a footballer.

References

1990 births
Living people
Sportspeople from Ibadan
Naturalized citizens of Germany
German sportspeople of Nigerian descent
Nigerian emigrants to Germany
Nigerian footballers
German footballers
Association football forwards
VfB Fortuna Chemnitz players
Chemnitzer FC players
Hertha BSC players
Hertha BSC II players
Rot-Weiß Oberhausen players
TSG Neustrelitz players
FC Carl Zeiss Jena players
ZFC Meuselwitz players
FC Amberg players
Fortuna Sittard players
Alemannia Aachen players
Zagłębie Sosnowiec players
Regionalliga players
3. Liga players
Eerste Divisie players
Ekstraklasa players
Nigerian expatriate footballers
German expatriate footballers
Expatriate footballers in the Netherlands
Nigerian expatriate sportspeople in the Netherlands
German expatriate sportspeople in the Netherlands
Expatriate footballers in Poland
Nigerian expatriate sportspeople in Poland
German expatriate sportspeople in Poland